Ciyun Temple is a Buddhist temple located at the foot of Mount Lion in Nan'an District, Chongqing.

History
The original temple dates back to the Tang dynasty (618–907). The modern temple was founded in 1757 during the reign of Qianlong Emperor in the Qing dynasty (1644–1911) and initially called "Temple of Guanyin". It was enlarged in 1927 by Chan master Yunyan and would later become the "Ciyun Temple". Ciyun Temple has been designated as a National Key Buddhist Temple in Han Chinese Area by the State Council of China in 1983.  A modern restoration of the entire temple complex was carried out in April 2016.

Architecture
Now the existing main buildings include Shanmen, Heavenly Kings Hall, Mahavira Hall, Hall of Samantabhadra, Hall of Guanyin, Hall of Manjushri, etc. Most of the halls and rooms still maintain the architectural style of the Tang dynasty (618–907).

Mahavira Hall
The Mahavira Hall is the main hall in the temple. It was bought from Myanmar in 1931. It is one of the four largest jade statues of Sakyamuni in China. Statues of Eighteen Arhats lines up on both sides.

References

Buddhist temples in Chongqing
Buildings and structures in Chongqing
Tourist attractions in Chongqing
1757 establishments in China
18th-century Buddhist temples
Religious buildings and structures completed in 1757